Senator Alquist may refer to:

Al Alquist (1908–2006), California State Senate
Elaine Alquist (born 1944), California State Senate